The 11th Cruiser Squadron and also known as Cruiser Force E was a formation of cruisers of the British Royal Navy from 1914 to 1917 and again from 1939 to 1940.

First World War 
The squadron was first formed in July 1914 and was attached to the Third Fleet. In August 1914 it was reassigned to the Channel Fleet. It was designated Cruiser Force E for service off the west coast of Ireland and was dispersed by January 1915.

Rear-Admiral/Senior Officer Commanding 
Included:

Second World War 
The squadron reformed in October 1939 when the 12th Cruiser Squadron of the Northern Patrol was re-designated 11th Cruiser Squadron. It was then transferred under the control of the Commander-in-Chief, North Atlantic at Gibraltar until it was disbanded in 1940.

Throughout the period the squadron was commanded by Commodore Richard J.R. Scott, holding the appointment of Commodore Commanding, 11th Cruiser Squadron.

Notes

References 
   
  
  Harley, Simon; Lovell, Tony. (2017) "Eleventh Cruiser Squadron (Royal Navy) - The Dreadnought Project". www.dreadnoughtproject.org. Harley and Lovell.
  Mackie, Gordon. (2018) "Royal Navy Senior Appointments from 1865" (PDF). gulabin.com. Gordon Mackie. 
  Watson, Dr Graham. (2015) "Royal Navy Organisation and Ship Deployments 1900-1914". www.naval-history.net. Graham Smith.
  Watson, Dr Graham. (2015) "Royal Navy Organisation and Ship Deployment, Inter-War Years 1914-1918". www.naval-history.net. Gordon Smith.
  Watson, Dr Graham. (2015) "Royal Navy Organisation in World War 2, 1939-1945: Overseas Commands and Fleets". www.naval-history.net. Gordon Smith.

Cruiser squadrons of the Royal Navy
Ship squadrons of the Royal Navy in World War I
Military units and formations of the Royal Navy in World War II